Sherman Willard Tribbitt (November 9, 1922 – August 14, 2010) was an American merchant and politician from Odessa in New Castle County, Delaware. He was a World War II veteran and a member of the Democratic Party who served in the Delaware General Assembly, as the 17th lieutenant governor of Delaware, and as the 67th governor of Delaware.

Early life and family
Tribbitt was born in Denton, Maryland, the son of Sherman L. and Minnie Thawley Tribbitt. He married Jeanne Webb in 1943. They had three children, James, Carol, and Sherman "Tip", and were members of the Presbyterian Church. He studied accounting at Beacom College in Wilmington, Delaware and briefly worked at the Security Trust Company in Wilmington. During World War II he served in the United States Navy. In early 1945 he was aboard the destroyer USS Frost in the North Atlantic when his unit received a Presidential Citation for sinking five U-boats.

Professional and political career
Following World War II, he and his father-in-law operated the Odessa Supply Company in Odessa, Delaware, where they lived.

In 1956, Tribbitt was elected to the first of four terms in the Delaware House of Representatives, where he served from 1957 to 1964. He was Speaker from 1959 to 1964. Tribbitt prevailed in a difficult convention contest for the nomination and was elected lieutenant governor of Delaware in 1964, defeating William T. Best, a State Representative from Rehoboth Beach. He served from January 19, 1965 to January 21, 1969. Surprised to find Governor Charles L. Terry Jr. wanted to serve two terms, Tribbitt had no choice but to run for a second term himself. Like Terry, he was narrowly defeated in the 1968 Republican landslide by Eugene Bookhammer, a State Senator from Lewes.

Governor of Delaware
Patiently planning a political recovery, Tribbitt was elected again to the Delaware House of Representatives in 1970 and was immediately elected minority leader for the 1971–72 session. When Governor Russell W. Peterson stumbled over the state's finances, Tribbitt had another opportunity for the governorship and was elected governor in 1972, defeating Peterson.

Tribbitt nearly made an appointment to the U.S. Senate. Future president Joe Biden was elected to the Senate in same year Tribbitt was elected. On December 18, 1972, Biden’s wife and daughter died in car crash which injured Biden’s sons. Biden contemplating on resigning his Senate seat, but decided to stay in the Senate up until his election as vice president 36 years later.

Tribbitt inherited the same state financial picture that forced his predecessor from office. In this time of high inflation there was constant pressure to raise salaries, particularly for teachers. Delaware's income tax rates were already among the highest in the nation and the solution was not obvious. There was an effort to levy a large tax on the one oil refinery in the state, but that was derailed when the owner, J. Paul Getty, threatened to close it. The union workers there opposed the legislation out of fear for their jobs. But the most serious financial crises involved the near-collapse of the Farmers' Bank of Delaware. It was the state's official bank, where all its funds were kept, and where many private investors had their life savings. The whole last year of Tribbitt's administration was spent trying to rectify the situation. Eventually the Federal Deposit Insurance Corporation (FDIC) agreed to make a large investment in the bank and buy many of its loans, but the state had to invest many millions as well. In 1981, under the next administration, the bank was sold.

Tribbitt took other steps to raise revenue, including beginning the Delaware Lottery. He also created the Department of Community Affairs and Economic Development to attract new industry to the state. Tribbitt sought a second term in 1976, but, largely because of the unresolved financial situation, was defeated by U.S. Representative Pete du Pont.

Later career
Tribbitt made another bid for governor in 1984, losing the Democratic primary to former Delaware Supreme Court justice William T. Quillen. In an unusual campaign tactic, Tribbitt refused to debate his courtroom-trained opponent, saying that he would lose the debate. After leaving office he worked with the Delaware River Basin Commission and the Diamond Group consulting firm. He relocated to Dover and finally to Rehoboth Beach.

Death
Sherman Tribbitt died on August 14, 2010, at the age of 87, a week after a severe fall. He had suffered from Alzheimer's disease. Jack Markell, Governor of Delaware at the time, ordered state flags lowered to half staff in Tribbitt's honor.

Almanac
Elections are held the first Tuesday after November 1. Members of the Delaware General Assembly take office the second Tuesday of January. State Representatives have a two-year term. The Governor and Lieutenant Governor take office the third Tuesday of January and each has a four-year term.

See also
 Delaware lunar sample displays

References

Images
Hall of Governors Portrait Gallery ; Portrait courtesy of Historical and Cultural Affairs, Dover.

External links
Biographical Directory of the Governors of the United States
Delaware’s Governors
The Political Graveyard

Places with more information
Delaware Historical Society; website; 505 North Market Street, Wilmington, Delaware 19801; (302) 655-7161
University of Delaware; Library website; 181 South College Avenue, Newark, Delaware 19717; (302) 831-2965

 
 

1922 births
2010 deaths
Democratic Party governors of Delaware
Lieutenant Governors of Delaware
United States Navy personnel of World War II
Businesspeople from Delaware
People from Odessa, Delaware
People from Denton, Maryland
Goldey–Beacom College alumni
American Presbyterians
Speakers of the Delaware House of Representatives
Democratic Party members of the Delaware House of Representatives
20th-century American businesspeople